Neuropeptides B/W receptor 1, also known as NPBW1 and GPR7, is a human protein encoded by the NPBWR1 gene. As implied by its name, it and related gene NPBW2 (with which it shares 70% nucleotide identity) are transmembranes protein that bind Neuropeptide B (NPB) and Neuropeptide W (NPW), both proteins expressed strongly in parts of the brain that regulate stress and fear including the extended amygdala and stria terminalis. When originally discovered in 1995, these receptors had no known ligands ("orphan receptors") and were called GPR7 and GPR8, but at least three groups in the early 2000s independently identified their endogenous ligands, triggering the name change in 2005.

Structure 
NPBW1 has seven transmembrane domains, which it unsurprisingly shares with NPBWR2, but also a family of somatostatin and opioid receptors, and like these proteins couple to Gi-class G proteins.

Functions 
In rodent models, NPBWR1 is over-expressed in Schwann cells associated with neuropathic pain, suggesting it inhibits inflammatory pain responses. Mice without NPBW1 exhibited a stronger hostile reaction to intruders, suggesting NPBW1 has a role in stress responses. Early studies indicated that NPB and NPW had a complex effect on appetite, but generally led to anorexia. Similarly, male rats lacking NPBWR1 exhibited hyperphagia and adult-onset obesity, though why female rats are unaffected is unknown. Researchers speculated that activating these pathways might decrease obesity, and synthesized a small-molecule ligand that is capable of stimulating both receptors at low concentrations.

References

Further reading

External links

G protein-coupled receptors